Feo, FEO, or similar may refer to:

People 
 Feo Aladag (born 1972), Australian film director and actor
 Francesco Feo (1691–1761), Italian composer
 Frutos Feo (born 1972), Spanish athlete
 Giacomo Feo (–1495), second husband of Caterina Sforza

Other uses 
 F. E. Osborne Junior High School, in Calgary, Alberta, Canada
 Firearms Enquiry Officer, a civilian  member of British police forces
 Front end optimization, a technique of dynamic site acceleration in website management
 Iron(II) oxide (FeO)
 Wüstite, a mineral form of iron(II) oxide

See also 
 DeFeo